Švec (feminine Švecová) is a Czech surname (meaning literally shoemaker). It may refer to:
 Denis Švec (born 1996), Slovak footballer
 František Švec, Czech canoer
 Jakub Švec (born 2000), Slovak footballer
 Jan G. Švec (born 1966), Czech voice scientist
 Jiří Švec (1935–2014), Czech wrestler
 Josef Švec (born 1935), Czech rower
 Joshua Svec (born 1987), Canadian football player
 Jozef Švec (born 1995), Slovak hockey player
 Marek Švec (wrestler) (born 1973), Czech wrestler
 Martin Švec (football player) (born 1984), Czech footballer
 Martin Švec (squash player) (born 1994), Czech squash player
 Michal Švec (born 1987), Czech footballer
 Otakar Švec (1892–1955), Czech sculptor
 Valér Švec (born 1935), Slovak footballer

See also
 
 Ševčík, a related Czech surname
 Shvets, a Ukrainian cognate

Occupational surnames
Czech-language surnames